This is a list of rivers and natural waterways that flow either wholly or partially through the ceremonial county of Wiltshire. The list is not comprehensive as there are many small brooks and streams without a recorded name on most official maps. There are three notable rivers that flow through the county: the River Avon (Bristol), the River Avon (Hampshire) and the River Thames.

Due to the geology of the county, the rivers and waterways discharge to the west, east and south. In addition to the natural waterways, the Kennet and Avon Canal crosses the county.

Rivers
 
Rivers
Wiltshire